The splanchnocranium (or visceral skeleton) is the portion of the cranium that is derived from pharyngeal arches. Splanchno indicates to the gut because the face forms around the mouth, which is an end of the gut. The splanchnocranium consists of cartilage and endochondral bone. In mammals, the splanchnocranium comprises the three ear ossicles (i.e., incus, malleus, and stapes), as well as the alisphenoid, the styloid process, the hyoid apparatus, and the thyroid cartilage.

In other tetrapods, such as amphibians and reptiles, homologous bones to those of mammals, such as the quadrate, articular, columella, and entoglossus are part of the splanchnocranium.

See also 
 Dermatocranium
 Endocranium

References 

Human anatomy
Vertebrate anatomy